Wersching is a surname. Notable people with the name include:
 Annie Wersching (1977–2023), American actress
 Ray Wersching (born 1950), Austrian former placekicker in the NFL